Wörth am Main (officially) is a town in the Miltenberg district in the Regierungsbezirk of Lower Franconia (Unterfranken) in Bavaria, Germany. It has a population of around 4,700.

Geography

Location 

Wörth lies in the Bavarian section of the Naturpark Bergstraße-Odenwald.

History 
It is believed that Roman soldiers built a simple earthen-wooden castrum in Wörth as early as Roman Emperor Domitian’s time (AD 81–96), and later a massive stone castrum. 

In Frankish times, beginning in the 6th century, Wörth was a centre of royal power and with Saint Martin’s Chapel, in today’s graveyard, it was a jumping-off point for Christian missionary work in the Odenwald. 

The town was refounded on its current site in the latter half of the 13th century by the Lords of Breuberg under the overlordship of the Archbishops of Mainz. In 1291, it had its first documentary mention as the town of Werde (“Island”). An important political change was the town's cession to the Kingdom of Bavaria in 1816. 

Wörth has long been a site of ship and boat building. Inland navigation also was an important source of local income. From 1652 until 1918 up to three ship yards built wooden river boats and ships here. The last remaining yard eventually moved to Erlenbach across the river, where it still operates.

Arts and culture
The old town is characterized by the mediaeval town fortifications and many historic monuments and timber-frame houses. From the former Electoral Mainz castle, the tower with its Renaissance portal is still preserved (today used by businesses).

Wörth lies on the Deutsche Limesstraße ("German Limes Road"). In Wörth is found the archaeological monument that was once a Roman castrum (specifically, a numerus castrum) at a spot where the older border, the Neckar-Odenwald Limes, met the Limes Germanicus following the Main river.

Museums 
There are the Schiffahrts- und Schiffbaumuseum Wörth ("Wörth Shipping and Shipbuilding Museum") in the former St. Wolfgang-Kirche (church) and a small branch office at the community centre with information about the Romans in Wörth.

Buildings 
 Bürgerhaus ("community centre", formerly the town hall) with Renaissance portal from 1600
 Wörth Shipping and Shipbuilding Museum in the former St. Wolfgang-Kirche (15th to 18th century). The mostly Baroque building was used as a church until 1903.
 New town with residential buildings made of bunter in numbers unique in Bavaria, 1883–85
 Town centre with town hall (1885, a former school), parish centre, railway station (1876), vocational college (1790, a former parish hall), Wendelinuskapelle (chapel, 1780) and estate (formerly the new town inn)
 St Nikolaus-Kirche, built in Romanesque Revival style from the year 1898, with a cross altar, Crucifixion group and Passion image
 "Gallows" monument, made out of two 7-metre-tall sandstone pillars, 1754
 St Martin-Kapelle in the graveyard, 14th century, originally established, however, in the time when the Lower Main was Christianized
 Schlossturm ("castle tower", today used by businesses), late 13th century
 Upper gate, 15th century
 Tannenturm (tower), 15th century
 Wörth castrum (1st-2nd century) and castrum bath, lying below the mill, only discernible by low humps in the ground

Transport
Bundesstraße 469 to the Würzburg-Frankfurt Autobahn A 3
Deutsche Bahn railway network
Main Federal Waterway

Governance

Town twinning

Wörth am Main is twinned with:
 Honfleur, Calvados, France (since 16 June 2006)

Mayors

In March 2014 Andreas Fath (Freie Wähler - Free voters) was elected the new mayor. He is the successor of Erwin Dotzel (CSU), he was 30 years in office.

Further reading 
 Trost, Werner: Wörth am Main. Chronik einer fränkischen Kleinstadt. 4 volumes. Wörth 1987-1999

References

External links 

St Nikolaus-Kirche

Miltenberg (district)